KBKZ (96.5 FM, "Coyote Country 96.5") is a radio station broadcasting a country music format. Licensed to Raton, New Mexico, United States, the station is currently owned by Phillips Broadcasting Company, Inc. and features programming from CNN Radio.

History
The Federal Communications Commission issued a construction permit for the station to David F. Phillips on November 23, 1998. The station was issued the KBKZ call sign on January 8, 1999. On February 12, 2001, the station's license was assigned by David Phillips to the current owner, Phillips Broadcasting. The station received its license to cover on March 20, 2001.

References

External links

BKZ
Country radio stations in the United States
Radio stations established in 2001
2001 establishments in New Mexico